Lucio Compagnucci  (born 23 February 1996) is an Argentine professional footballer who plays as an offensive midfielder for Gimnasia y Esgrima.

Club career
Compagnucci debuted professionally for Vélez Sarsfield playing as a starter in the last fixture of the 2014 Argentine Primera División, a 0–2 defeat to San Lorenzo de Almagro. He made eight appearances in the Primera before joining Huracán in June 2016.

International career
In 2013, Compagnucci won with the Argentina national under-17 football team the South American Under-17 Football Championship, playing 7 games as a starter. He was subsequently called to play the FIFA U-17 World Cup with the team, achieving a 4th-place finish. The midfielder played 6 games as a starter, missing only the second group stage game due to being sent off in the team's debut. He also scored once, in the 1–4 defeat to Sweden for the third place match.

Two years later, Compagnucci was called by Humberto Grondona (who had previously been his coach in the under-17 national team) to play the 2015 South American Youth Championship with the Argentina national under-20 football team. In the team's championship winning campaign, the midfielder played 5 games and scored the last-minute equalizer against Colombia in the final stage. However, this game would be his last of the competition, after being suspended for three matches due to an aggression to an opposition player.

Personal life
Lucio is the son of former footballer and current coach Carlos Compagnucci, who both played for and managed Vélez Sarsfield.

Honours

International
Argentina U-17
South American Under-17 Football Championship (1): 2013

Argentina U-20
South American U-20 Football Championship (1): 2015

References

External links
 Profile at Vélez Sarsfield's official website 
 Argentine Primera statistics at Fútbol XXI  
 

1996 births
Living people
Argentine footballers
Argentine expatriate footballers
Association football midfielders
Club Atlético Vélez Sarsfield footballers
Club Atlético Huracán footballers
San Luis de Quillota footballers
Real Murcia players
Gimnasia y Esgrima de Mendoza footballers
Chilean Primera División players
Argentine Primera División players
Expatriate footballers in Chile
Argentina youth international footballers
Argentina under-20 international footballers
Footballers from Buenos Aires